"Communication Studies" is the sixteenth episode of the first season of the U.S. television sitcom Community. It originally aired on February 11, 2010, on NBC.

In the episode, Jeff tries to help Britta regain the confidence in their relationship after an embarrassing drunk dial by her. Meanwhile, Annie and Shirley's plan to take revenge on Chang for humiliating Troy and Pierce backfires.

The episode was written by Chris McKenna and directed by Adam Davidson. It received mostly positive critical reviews.

Plot
Jeff (Joel McHale) is invited to Greendale College's Valentine's Day dance by his girlfriend and statistics professor, Michelle (Lauren Stamile). On the way to the library, he discovers a voicemail from a drunk Britta (Gillian Jacobs) from the previous night. At the library, Annie (Alison Brie), Shirley (Yvette Nicole Brown) and Abed (Danny Pudi) receive Valentine's Day gifts, but Troy (Donald Glover) and Pierce (Chevy Chase) do not. Jeff plays a hungover Britta the message she left him, mocking the implication of the booty call, leaving her humiliated.

The booty call changes Jeff and Britta's mutually competitive relationship as she is too embarrassed to talk to him. Abed explains that the only way they can go back to the old relationship is for her to see him embarrass himself. Jeff and Abed spend the evening getting drunk enough for Jeff to make a believable call. The next day, they discover that Jeff made calls to both Michelle and Britta, but don't remember anything about either of them.

At Spanish class, the Greendale Human Being delivers Valentine's gifts to Troy and Pierce. Señor Chang (Ken Jeong) guesses right away that the presents were sent by themselves to make it look like they have girlfriends. Chang ridicules them in front of the class. Later, Annie and Shirley devise a plan to prank Chang in revenge. The next day in class, Chang receives a letter purportedly from Princeton offering him an associate professor position. He instantly calls the bluff, and blames Troy and Pierce for the failed prank. In retribution, he forces them to escort him to the Valentine's dance wearing ladies' pantsuits and threatens to fail them if they refuse.

At the dance, Michelle is angry at Jeff for drunk calling her and then hanging up after discovering she wasn't Britta. Jeff tries to come clean, but Michelle refuses to listen. Troy and Pierce are dressed up in pantsuits and ready to hit the dance floor, but are stopped by Annie and Shirley. Annie and Shirley confess to sending the fake letter and have decided to tell Chang the truth so that they can suffer the consequences. However, Troy and Pierce are touched by their gesture, and follow through with their embarrassing ordeal.

Britta arrives, dressed formally, and tells Jeff that he invited her to the dance. Jeff panics and confesses that his relationship with Michelle is likely to be over because of the voicemails. Britta then reveals that he didn't actually invite her and that she dressed up to pull a prank on him. She then plays to Michelle the voicemail she received from Jeff, in which he confesses his love for Michelle, which leads to the couple's reconciliation.

In the end tag, Pierce abandons Troy after the party to get frozen yogurt with Chang.

Production
"Communication Studies" was written by Chris McKenna, his first writing credit of the series. It was directed by Adam Davidson, his second directing credit.

Music 
Several songs can be heard in the episode: We are not alone - Karla DeVito, from The Breakfast Club, during the drinking montage; Going Crazy- The Paparazzi Kids, when Chang dances with Pierce and Troy; If I Die Before You - Ludwig Göransson, while Britta and Jeff have their conversation at the dance.

Cultural references
When Jeff first encounters Britta having a hangover, he asks, "Can I get you an alibi for Cobain's suicide?" The next day, Britta counters a hungover Jeff's zinger: "You look like you're about ready to marry Courtney Love."

When describing the change in dynamics of Jeff and Britta's relationship, Abed uses an example from Who's the Boss? in which Tony sees Angela naked in the opening credits. When devising a plan to fix the relationship, Abed uses the example from the episode "The One With the Boobies" in Friends. Chandler sees Rachel naked and had to reciprocate by getting naked for Rachel.

The montage of bizarre dancing and other wacky activities by Jeff and Abed while drunk was inspired by The Breakfast Club, a film which was mentioned by Abed in the episode as he fails to recall the name of the female lead.

Reception

Ratings
In its original American broadcast, "Communication Studies" was viewed by an estimated 5.15 million people, with a Nielsen rating/share of 2.3/7 in the 18–49 demographic.

Reviews
"Communication Studies" received mostly positive reviews from critics.

Jonah Krakow of IGN said "There was plenty to love about this episode, including some great interaction between Jeff and Britta, some spot-on pop culture quips from Abed and some hilarious character work from Troy, Pierce and Senor Chang." He gave the episode an 8.8/10 rating. Jason Hughes of AOL TV said, "Suddenly I want to spend at least 40 more minutes in the world of 'Community' after tonight's episode... Jeff and Abed tore it up with one of the most bizarre drunk montages I've ever seen, culminating with Abed in the absolute best 'aftermath' position I've ever seen. Eric Hochberger of TV Fanatic gave the episode a 4.0/5 rating, saying "The main story line was not only hilarious, but also strong in terms of cementing Jeff's relationship with Slater and pushing off any potential Britta-Jeff pairing for seasons.  That's kind of a good thing because we don't need yet another show based on sexual tension."

Emily VanDerWerff of The A.V. Club gave "Communication Studies" a 'B' and said the episode had too many plot twists: "It's the thing where you think there's going to be a standard sitcom plot twist that occurs, and then the show goes out of its way to show you that the standard plot twist didn't actually happen. Community tries it four or five times in tonight's episode, and by the end, it feels a little too much like piling on." VanDerWerff praised the show's ending and the handling of the Jeff-Britta dynamic: "what finally makes this one work for me is that last scene between Michelle, Jeff and Britta. Obviously, this show is going to push Jeff and Britta together at some point, but I appreciate a show that's willing to do this less because it's obligatory and more because it wants to toy with our expectations."

References

External links
 "Communication Studies" at NBC.com
 

Community (season 1) episodes
2010 American television episodes
Valentine's Day television episodes